Bauknecht, formally Bauknecht Hausgeräte GmbH, was one of Germany's leading manufacturers of household appliances, and since 1989 has been a brand of Whirlpool Corporation. The headquarters of the company was formerly in Schorndorf in Baden-Württemberg until 2006 when it relocated to Stuttgart. Whirlpool has closed its three plants in Calw (refrigerators / freezers), Neunkirchen (dishwashers) and Schorndorf (washers and dryers). Since 2012 all Bauknecht branded products have been manufactured outside Germany.

History
The company was founded in 1919 by Gottlob Bauknecht as an electrical workshop in Neckartenzlingen. He received recognition for the first time for his self-developed universal electric motor "Landfreund".

But it was only in the postwar Germany when the company made its big step in the production of electrical appliances, starting in 1948 with the kitchen appliances "Allfix". In 1951, the first Bauknecht refrigerator was produced, in 1958 the first washing machine, and in 1964 the first dishwasher.

On 9 September 1976, the company founder died at the age of 84 years, leaving his sons the management. Because of some loss-making foreign investments and the withdrawal of banks from other financing commitments, on 13 May 1982 a settlement was requested. On 29 October 1982, the District Court of Stuttgart paved the way for bankruptcy over the assets of Bauknecht. On 2 November 1982 Volker Grub, the liquidator, signed a takeover agreement with the German division of Philips (Deutsche Philips Industrie AG).

Since 1989, Bauknecht Hausgeräte GmbH has been part of the American group Whirlpool Corporation. The Neunkirchen facility in Saarland developed and built dishwashers from 1971. In 1996, the European Technology Centre for dishwashers was also settled in Neunkirchen. The Global Development Center for washing machines and dryers, in which the large volume washers for the US market were produced was sited in Schorndorf.

At the beginning of 2012, the automotive supplier ZF Friedrichshafen took over the plant in Neunkirchen with 240 out of the 280 local employees, in order to expand its production capacity in transmission components. After retraining, the employees who previously mounted dishwashers, manufactured vehicle transmissions. At the end of 2012  the production site in Schorndorf also closed.

References

External links 
 Website
 Corporate Website

 
Manufacturing companies based in Stuttgart
Home appliance manufacturers of Germany
Home appliance brands
Electronics companies established in 1919
1989 mergers and acquisitions